Bjerk is a surname. Notable people with the surname include:

 Thale Bjerk (born 2000), Norwegian racing cyclist